William Hay (December 1594 – 26 December 1664) was an English politician who sat in the House of Commons at various times between 1641 and 1660.

In 1641, Hay was elected Member of Parliament for Rye in the Long Parliament. He was re-elected MP for Rye in the Second Protectorate Parliament in 1656 and in the Third Protectorate Parliament in 1659. In 1660 he was re-elected MP for Rye in the  Convention Parliament. 
 
Hay died at the age of 70.

References

1594 births
1664 deaths
People from Rye, East Sussex
Place of birth missing
English MPs 1640–1648
English MPs 1648–1653
English MPs 1656–1658
English MPs 1659
English MPs 1660